Wakebridge is a hamlet in Derbyshire, England. It is located 1 mile north-west of Crich and lies close to Crich quarry.

Hamlets in Derbyshire
Geography of Amber Valley